Marlon Ronald Devonish,  (born 1 June 1976) is an English former sprinter who competed in the 100 metres and 200 metres. A prodigious relay runner with particular strength as a 'bend' runner, Devonish ran the third leg for the Great Britain quartet which won the 4 x 100 metres at the 2004 Olympic Games, and won four World Championship medals in the same event in 1999, 2005, 2007 and 2009.

Early life
Devonish attended Caludon Castle School in Coventry.

Career
He is a member of the Coventry Godiva Harriers athletics club and was coached by Tony Lester. Early in his career he was successful at both 100 and 200-metre distances, winning English Schools and European Junior titles at both, but in later years he concentrated mostly on the longer distance. He was also a regular member of both the British and, at the Commonwealth Games, English 4 x 100-metre sprint relay teams, to some considerable success. He is a current Commonwealth Games record holder in the relay event.

The most notable achievement of his career came at the 2004 Summer Olympics in Athens. There Devonish, along with Jason Gardener, Darren Campbell and Mark Lewis-Francis, won a gold medal in the 4 x 100 m. relay, where the quartet defeated the pre-race favourites, United States team, by just 0.01 seconds, in a season's best of 38.07.

At the British Championships (and team trials for the 2006 European Championships) in July 2006, Devonish became the first man since Linford Christie in 1988 to win both the 100 m and 200 m races at the event. At the championship finals, he took the bronze medal in the 200 m.

Devonish retained his 100 m title at the British Championships the following year. For the 2007 season Devonish improved his performance in the 100 m with a new personal best and competed in this event at the 2007 World Championships in Osaka rather than the 200 m which he had previously specialised in. Devonish finished 6th in the 100 m final.

Devonish represented Great Britain at the 2008 Summer Olympics in Beijing. He competed at the 4x100 metres relay together with Simeon Williamson, Tyrone Edgar and Craig Pickering. In their qualification heat they were disqualified and eliminated. He also took part in the 200 metres individual, finishing first with a time of 20.49 seconds in his first round heat. With 20.43 seconds in his second round he only placed fourth in his heat, but his time was among the four best losing times and enough to qualify for the semi-finals. There he came to 20.57 seconds and the seventh time in his race, which was not enough for the final.

He competed at the 2009 Manchester City Games, finishing second in the 150 metres final in 15.07 seconds. He was beaten by Usain Bolt who ran a world best-beating time.

On 22 August 2009, Devonish was a member of the Great Britain and Northern Ireland men's 4x100m relay team that took bronze at the IAAF World Championships in Berlin with a season's best of 38.02. Harry Aikines-Aryeetey, Simeon Williamson and Tyrone Edgar ran the other legs.

Post-athletics
On 16 July 2013, Devonish was brought in as sprint coach for Gloucester Rugby at Kingsholm Stadium, Gloucester.

On 8 January 2018, Devonish started working for the British International School Shanghai located in Puxi, Shanghai, China as their elite athlete performance coach in residence.

International competition record

1Representing Europe
2Did not finish in the final

Personal bests

References

External links
 
 'Marlon hails sprint revival' – BBC.co.uk, 29 August 2004

1976 births
Living people
Sportspeople from Coventry
English male sprinters
British male sprinters
Olympic male sprinters
Olympic athletes of Great Britain
Olympic gold medallists for Great Britain
Olympic gold medalists in athletics (track and field)
Athletes (track and field) at the 2000 Summer Olympics
Athletes (track and field) at the 2004 Summer Olympics
Athletes (track and field) at the 2008 Summer Olympics
Medalists at the 2004 Summer Olympics
English Olympic medallists
Commonwealth Games gold medallists for England
Commonwealth Games silver medallists for England
Commonwealth Games medallists in athletics
Commonwealth Games gold medallists in athletics
Athletes (track and field) at the 1998 Commonwealth Games
Athletes (track and field) at the 2002 Commonwealth Games
Athletes (track and field) at the 2006 Commonwealth Games
Athletes (track and field) at the 2010 Commonwealth Games
Goodwill Games medalists in athletics
Competitors at the 2001 Goodwill Games
World Athletics Championships medalists
World Athletics Indoor Championships winners
IAAF Continental Cup winners
European Athletics Championships winners
European Athletics Championships medalists
British Athletics Championships winners
AAA Championships winners
Members of the Order of the British Empire
Black British sportspeople
English people of Jamaican descent
Goodwill Games gold medalists in athletics
Medallists at the 1998 Commonwealth Games
Medallists at the 2002 Commonwealth Games
Medallists at the 2010 Commonwealth Games